Gambone is a surname. Notable people with the surname include:
Joseph C. Gambone, American surgeon
Philip Gambone (born 1948), American writer
Ralph M. Gambone, U.S. Navy band leader
 Victor Gambone, Terri Schiavo's primary care physician

Italian-language surnames